Vishwajit Pratapsingh Rane (born 23 March 1971) is an Indian politician and a cabinet Minister in the Government of Goa headed by Pramod Sawant. He is the son of Pratapsingh Raoji Rane who is a former Chief Minister of Goa and an incumbent Indian National Congress party MLA in the Goa Legislative Assembly. Vishwajit Rane was the Minister of Health, Agriculture &  Craftsmen Training in the Government of Goa led by Digambar Kamat from June 2007 to March 2012. Rane resigned as the MLA of the Valpoi Constituency and also from the Indian National Congress on 16 March 2017. He later joined the Bharatiya Janata Party on 7 April 2017 and was sworn in as a Cabinet Minister on 12 April 2017 in the cabinet led by Manohar Parrikar. He was allotted the Health portfolio on 18 April 2017. In 2022, Rane won the assembly election on BJP ticket from Poriem. He made national headlines during his alleged involvement in the Rafale Aircraft controversy.

Early life and personal background
Vishwajit Rane was born in Mumbai to veteran politician Pratapsingh Raoji Rane and his wife Vijayadevi Rane. He did his schooling in Panaji's People's High School. Vishwajit graduated from the Goa University with a Bachelor of Commerce degree and obtained a postgraduate diploma in Management Studies from the T. A. Pai Management Institute at Manipal. He represented Goa State in badminton.

Vishwajit is married to Dr. Divya Timblo.

Political career
Vishwajit Rane started his political career as a member of the Indian National Congress and also used the platform of his organisation named Sattari Yuva Morcha (सत्तरी युवा मोर्चा). In 2016, the organisation submitted an application to the Election Commission of India to be registered as a political party but Vishwajit maintained that he had no role in the same. Vishwajit Rane established the Sattari Yuva Morcha and served as its President. He was also the Chairman of the Government of Goa's Goa Tourism Development Corporation. Vishwajit was the General Secretary of the Goa Pradesh Congress Committee.

2007 Assembly elections
Vishwajit Rane contested the 2007 Goa Legislative Assembly elections as an independent candidate. The Indian National Congress then had decided that it would not allot its candidature to more than one person from the same family. As a result, Pratapsingh Rane successfully contested as the Indian National Congress candidate in the 2007 Goa Legislative Assembly elections from the Poriem constituency while Vishwajit successfully contested as an independent from the neighbouring Valpoi constituency after resigning as the General Secretary of the Goa Pradesh Congress Committee and also from the party's primary membership.

Health, Agriculture & Craftsmen Training Minister
After the 2007 Legislative Goa Assembly elections, the Indian National Congress party led by Digambar Kamat formed a coalition government in Goa. Vishwajit was inducted as a Cabinet Minister in the Government led by Kamat. He was allocated the portfolios of Health, Agriculture & Craftsmen Training.

On 24 June 2010, Rane resigned as the independent MLA and also as a Cabinet Minister, to contest a by-election from Valpoi constituency as an Indian National Congress candidate. He joined the Indian National Congress and was sworn in again as the Cabinet Minister the same day. Rane successfully retained the Valpoi constituency in the by-election.

During his tenure as a Cabinet Minister, Vishwajit Rane expanded his influence in the Sattari and Bicholim talukas of Goa. After the demise of the Gurudas Gawas who was the Indian National Congress legislator from Pale constituency, Vishwajit played a key role in the election of the former's brother Pratap Gauns from the constituency in a bye-election. He also ensured the victory of several candidates backed by him.

2012 Assembly elections
In the 2012 Goa Legislative Assembly elections, Vishwajit emerged victorious from Valpoi constituency as a candidate of the Indian National Congress.

2017 Assembly elections and resignation from the Indian National Congress
Vishwajit Rane retained his Valpoi constituency as a candidate of the Indian National Congress in the 2017 Goa Legislative Assembly elections. But after the Indian National Congress could not form the government despite securing 17 seats in the 40-member Goa Legislative Assembly, Vishwajit Rane blamed the party leadership. He also wrote to Rahul Gandhi, the Vice President of the Indian National Congress, complaining about the indecisiveness of the party leaders like Digvijaya Singh (who was the Goa desk in-charge of the party) and threatening to resign from the party if no heed was paid to his grievances. While Chief Minister of Goa Manohar Parrikar proved his majority on the floor of the house on 16 March 2017, Vishwajit Rane remained absent during the voting in protest of the leaders of the Indian National Congress.

The same day, he resigned from the membership of the Indian National Congress and also as the MLA of Valpoi Constituency. On 7 April 2017, Rane joined the Bharatiya Janata Party and announced that he would contest a bye-election in the Valpoi Constituency as a Bharatiya Janata Party candidate.

Cabinet Minister in the Manohar Parrikar-led government
Vishwajit Rane was sworn in as a Cabinet Minister on 12 April 2017 in the cabinet led by Manohar Parrikar. He was allotted the portfolio of Health. As the Health Minister in the third Manohar Parrikar Ministry, Rane took the decision of charging nominal fees in the Goa Medical College, Hospicio Hospital and the Asilo Hospital for the patients who are not residents of the state of Goa since 1 January 2018.

2022 Goa Legislative Assembly Election

Vishwajit Rane retained his Valpoi constituency as a candidate of the Bharatiya Janata Party in the 2022 Goa Legislative Assembly elections. Deviya Rane his spouse also won the Porem Constituency election on the Bharatiya Janata Party ticket. Vishwajit and Deviya Rane are now spousal couples in Goa Legislative Assembly. The other spousal couples are Atanasio Monserrate and Jennifer Monserrate, and Francis Lobo and Delilah Lobo.

References

1973 births
Living people
Former members of Indian National Congress from Goa
People from North Goa district
Goa MLAs 2017–2022
Bharatiya Janata Party politicians from Goa
Goa MLAs 2007–2012
Goa MLAs 2012–2017
Goa MLAs 2022–2027